Robert "Bob" Wilson (born 1867) was an Irish international footballer who played club football for Distillery and Cliftonville as a right back.

Wilson earned one cap for Ireland at the 1888 British Home Championship.

Wilson played alongside his father Matt in the 1886 Irish Cup Final.

External links
NIFG profile

1867 births
Year of death missing
Irish association footballers (before 1923)
Pre-1950 IFA international footballers
Lisburn Distillery F.C. players
Cliftonville F.C. players
Association football defenders